Ernest Hemingway owned a  fishing boat named Pilar. It was acquired in April 1934 from Wheeler Shipbuilding in Brooklyn, New York, for $7,495. "Pilar" was a nickname for Hemingway's second wife, Pauline, and also the name of the woman leader of the partisan band in his 1940 novel of the Spanish Civil War, For Whom the Bell Tolls. Hemingway regularly fished off the boat in the waters of Key West, Florida, Marquesas Keys, and the Gulf Stream off the Cuban coast. He made three trips with the boat to the Bimini islands, wherein his fishing, drinking, and fighting exploits drew much attention and remain part of the islands' history. In addition to fishing trips on Pilar, Hemingway contributed to scientific research, including collaboration with the Smithsonian Institution. Several of Hemingway's books were influenced by time spent on the boat, most notably, The Old Man and the Sea (1953) and Islands in the Stream (1970). The yacht also inspired the name of Playa Pilar (Pilar Beach) on Cayo Guillermo. A smaller replica of the boat is depicted in the opening and other scenes in the 2012 film Hemingway & Gellhorn.

Acquisition

Hemingway acquired the boat on April 18, 1934, after returning from a safari in Africa. The boat was a modified version of the Wheeler Playmate line. The final price for the boat was $7,495 which included modifications such as a livewell to contain fish, dual-engine set-up, lowering the boat's transom by twelve inches and adding a full-width roller on the stern to aid in hauling large fish onto the boat. A flying bridge was added later, but not by Wheeler. In addition, the boat's hull was painted black instead of the stock white color.

The boat was constructed in the Coney Island yard of the Wheeler company, now of Chapel Hill, NC (which also built Fidel Castro's "Granma"), and delivered to Hemingway at Miami, attached to a wooden cradle which was part of the purchase price. With a friend and a Wheeler representative, Hemingway sailed the boat under its own power from Miami to Key West through Hawk Channel, a semi-protected waterway from Biscayne National Park to Key West, lying between the Key islands and the barrier reefs.

Science on the boat
In addition to hunting, Hemingway was an avid fisherman and a great contributor to the development of the sport. He also contributed to the knowledge of Atlantic marine life. During his first visit to Cuba with Pilar, Hemingway hosted Charles Cadwalader, director of the Academy of Natural Sciences of Philadelphia, and Henry Fowler, the Academy's chief ichthyologist. These two scientists were in Cuba trying to determine the taxonomy of marlin species. They attempted to determine if white, blue, black, or striped marlin were different species or just color variants of the same species. As a result of their efforts on the boat, they reclassified the North Atlantic marlin variants.

U-boat patrols
During World War II, Hemingway used his boat to search for German U-boats in the Caribbean waters. Pilar was outfitted with communications gear including HF/DF or "Huff-Duff" direction-finding equipment. His minimal armament included a Thompson submachine gun and grenades. Most accounts state that any effort to attack a submarine would have been futile. Hemingway wrote about his intent to attack if he spotted a sub. Other accounts of these patrols imply that they were a farce and that he did them in return for extra gas rations and immunity from Cuban police for driving drunk. His hunting for U-Boats was the inspiration for the third act, "At Sea," in his novel Islands in the Stream.

Bimini trips

Hemingway spent three summers in Bimini, starting with the first voyage in April 1935. During the initial attempt at the crossing, he accidentally shot himself in the leg while attempting to boat a shark he caught. On a subsequent trip, he fished with Bror von Blixen-Finecke, with whom he had been on a safari and whose former wife was Karen Blixen, author of Out of Africa. In addition, there are ties to him and Hemingway through Hemingway's books Green Hills of Africa and Under Kilimanjaro.

During the Bimini trips, Hemingway perfected fishing techniques for tuna. He was the first person to land a giant tuna unmutilated. Known as "apple-coring," it had been expected for sharks to attack fish as they tired and were near the boat. His technique involved applying constant pressure, to the fish. Where previous methods allowed the fish to run to tire it,  he would attempt to boat the fish as soon as possible. He experimented with using a skiff which he would transfer to and have the fish pull the boat to weaken it. He also discovered marlins had a defense mechanism in their swords and noses that made them unattractive to sharks, but that tuna lacked such a defense. He found a tuna's primary defense against the sharks was speed, and as the fish tire, they became easy targets. He used a Thompson sub-machine gun to shoot at sharks that would appear as the tuna tire and neared the boat.

The photo labelled "Hemingway and Strater with the remaining 500 lb of marlin" shows Hemingway and Henry "Mike" Strater with a half-eaten ("apple-cored") marlin. This fish weighed more than 500 pounds in its half-eaten state. It was projected to be more than 1,000 lb when whole. During the landing of the fish, Hemingway used a Thompson machine gun to shoot at the sharks in an attempt to ward them off. Unfortunately, the effect of the shark blood in the water attracted more sharks, which damaged the marlin. In the end, the marlin's state somewhat recalls that of the monster marlin in Hemingway's later masterpiece The Old Man and the Sea. The incident significantly damaged his relationship with Strater, who believed the use of Hemingway's machine gun against the sharks was the primary reason he lost the most significant fish he ever caught.

While on Bimini, Hemingway wrote magazine articles for Esquire and worked on his novel, To Have And Have Not. His reputation as a big game angler began to grow. He landed many giant tuna and marlin. He also staged boxing matches with the locals, offering $100 (this amount ranged upward to $250 based on various accounts) to anyone who could last a few rounds with him. His fighting was not contained to the ring. During a dockside brawl, he punched and knocked out Joe Knapp, a wealthy magazine publisher. Hemingway at first lived on Pilar. He later moved to a cottage near Brown's Dock and eventually a room at the Compleat Angler Hotel, staying in Room Number 1.

Fishing
Hemingway caught numerous record-breaking fish from Pilar. In 1935, he won every tournament in the Key West-Havana-Bimini triangle, competing against notable sportsmen Michael Lerner and S. Kip Farrington. In 1938 he established a world record by catching seven marlins in one day. He was the first person ever to boat a giant tuna in an undamaged state. This effort was attributed to him pulling the fish into the boat before it had tired, thereby preventing sharks from eating it. Hemingway kept meticulous fishing logs, including guests, weather, current conditions, fish caught, and other information. During the first summer of owning the boat, Arnold Samuelson, an aspiring writer, served as a deckhand and recorded the dictated logs on paper. He subsequently typed out the logs which are on display at the John F. Kennedy Presidential Library and Museum. Samuelson later wrote an account of the summer in book form which was published posthumously by his daughter.

Named after him, The Hemingway Fishing Tournament has been held in Cuba since 1950. It is a four-day tournament where contestants go for marlin, tuna, wahoo, and other fish using a 50-pound fishing line. Hemingway won the first three years it was held.

Notable guests

Archibald MacLeish
Ava Gardner
Bror von Blixen-Finecke
Fidel Castro
John Dos Passos
Martha Gellhorn
Maxwell Perkins
Sara Murphy
Sidney Franklin

Disposition

The boat is on display in Cuba at Finca La Vigía, Havana. Hemingway left the boat to his captain Gregorio Fuentes. Fuentes, one of the hired captains of the boat, is said to have been the basis for the character Santiago from The Old Man and the Sea and Eddy from Islands in the Stream. The Cuban government now owns the boat after being donated to the people of Cuba by Fuentes. The sister ship of Pilar is on display in the Bass Pro Shops store in Islamorada, Florida. Hemingway fished from the sister ship, which made him have Pilar commissioned.

References

External links

Pilar | Wheeler Yacht Company
The Amazing True Story of Fidel Castro's Mystery Motoryacht

Ernest Hemingway
Fishing ships of the United States
Recreational fishing